This article lists various water polo records and statistics in relation to the Yugoslavia men's national water polo team at the Summer Olympics.

The Yugoslavia men's national water polo team has participated in 12 of 27 official men's water polo tournaments.

Abbreviations

Team statistics

Comprehensive results by tournament
Notes:
 Results of Olympic qualification tournaments are not included. Numbers refer to the final placing of each team at the respective Games.
 At the 1904 Summer Olympics, a water polo tournament was contested, but only American contestants participated. Currently the International Olympic Committee (IOC) and the International Swimming Federation (FINA) consider water polo event as part of unofficial program in 1904.
 Related teams: Croatia men's Olympic water polo team (statistics), FR Yugoslavia men's Olympic water polo team† (statistics), Serbia and Montenegro men's Olympic water polo team† (statistics), Montenegro men's Olympic water polo team (statistics), Serbia men's Olympic water polo team (statistics).
 Last updated: 5 May 2021.

Legend

  – Champions
  – Runners-up
  – Third place
  – Fourth place
  – The nation did not participate in the Games
  – Qualified for forthcoming tournament
 Team† – Defunct team

Abbreviation
 FRY – FR Yugoslavia
 SCG – Serbia and Montenegro

Number of appearances
Last updated: 5 May 2021.

Legend
 Team† – Defunct team

Best finishes
Last updated: 5 May 2021.

Legend
 Team† – Defunct team

Finishes in the top four
Last updated: 5 May 2021.

Legend
 Team† – Defunct team

Medal table
Last updated: 5 May 2021.

Legend
 Team† – Defunct team

Player statistics

Multiple appearances

The following table is pre-sorted by number of Olympic appearances (in descending order), year of the last Olympic appearance (in ascending order), year of the first Olympic appearance (in ascending order), date of birth (in ascending order), name of the player (in ascending order), respectively.

Note:
 Dubravko Šimenc is listed in Croatia men's Olympic water polo team records and statistics.

Multiple medalists

The following table is pre-sorted by total number of Olympic medals (in descending order), number of Olympic gold medals (in descending order), number of Olympic silver medals (in descending order), year of receiving the last Olympic medal (in ascending order), year of receiving the first Olympic medal (in ascending order), name of the player (in ascending order), respectively.

Note:
 Perica Bukić is listed in Croatia men's Olympic water polo team records and statistics.

Top goalscorers

The following table is pre-sorted by number of total goals (in descending order), year of the last Olympic appearance (in ascending order), year of the first Olympic appearance (in ascending order), name of the player (in ascending order), respectively.

Note:
 Dubravko Šimenc is listed in Croatia men's Olympic water polo team records and statistics.

Goalkeepers

The following table is pre-sorted by edition of the Olympics (in ascending order), cap number or name of the goalkeeper (in ascending order), respectively.

Last updated: 23 May 2021.

Note:
 Aleksandar Šoštar is also listed in FR Yugoslavia men's Olympic water polo team records and statistics.

Coach statistics

Medals as coach and player
The following table is pre-sorted by total number of Olympic medals (in descending order), number of Olympic gold medals (in descending order), number of Olympic silver medals (in descending order), year of winning the last Olympic medal (in ascending order), year of winning the first Olympic medal (in ascending order), name of the person (in ascending order), respectively. Last updated: 5 May 2021.

Ratko Rudić won a silver medal for Yugoslavia at the 1980 Summer Olympics. Upon retirement as an athlete, he immediately entered the coaching ranks. During his career, Rudić guided three different men's national teams to five Olympic medals, more than any other coaches.

Ivo Trumbić won the silver medal in 1964 and Yugoslavia's first Olympic gold medal in water polo in 1968. He moved to the Netherlands in 1973, hired as the head coach of the Netherlands men's national team. At the 1976 Olympics in Montreal, he led the Dutch team to win a bronze medal.

Olympic champions

1968 Summer Olympics

1984 Summer Olympics

1988 Summer Olympics

Water polo people at the opening and closing ceremonies

Flag bearers

Some sportspeople were chosen to carry the national flag of their country at the opening and closing ceremonies of the Olympic Games. As of the 1988 Summer Olympics, three male water polo players were given the honour to carry the flag for Yugoslavia.

Legend
  – Opening ceremony of the 2008 Summer Olympics
  – Closing ceremony of the 2012 Summer Olympics
 Flag bearer‡ – Flag bearer who won the tournament with his team

See also
 Croatia men's Olympic water polo team records and statistics
 Serbia and Montenegro men's Olympic water polo team records and statistics
 Montenegro men's Olympic water polo team records and statistics
 Serbia men's Olympic water polo team records and statistics
 List of men's Olympic water polo tournament records and statistics
 Lists of Olympic water polo records and statistics
 Yugoslavia at the Olympics

Notes

References

Sources

ISHOF

External links
 Olympic water polo – Official website

.Olympics, Men
Olympic water polo team records and statistics